Bob Todd (born September 27, 1948) is an American former baseball coach and pitcher. He was the head coach of the Ohio State University baseball program.  In 23 seasons there his teams compiled a 901–477–2 record. He previously coached Kent State to a 124–82 record. He has guided Ohio State to two 50-win seasons, in 1991 and 1999. His teams won the Big Ten championship five consecutive years (1991–1995).  He announced his retirement at the end of the 2010 season.

Awards and honors
 Big Ten Coach of the Year (1989, 1994, 1999, 2001)
 National Coach of the Year (1994)

References

External links
 Ohio State profile

1948 births
Living people
Kent State Golden Flashes baseball coaches
Missouri Tigers baseball coaches
Ohio State Buckeyes baseball coaches
National College Baseball Hall of Fame inductees